South Lamar School is a K–12 unified school district located in Millport, Alabama. The principal is Lisa Newman Wright. South Lamar School's mascot is a Stallion. The school's colors are crimson and gold. It is a small, 1A school. In 2018, it received a financial reward from the state for having its third-graders test among the best in the state. US News reported the student body was more than 80 percent white and about 12 percent African American.

In 1992, the school's basketball team won a state championship. The school's basketball court was dedicated in the coach of that team's honor, Johnnie Wilson. He coached at the school for 32 years.

History 
South Lamar School was founded in 1986.

Alumni
Darryl Wilson, collegiate and professional basketball player

See also
List of high schools in Alabama

References

School districts in Alabama